Yuanlingshan is a form of round-collared upper garment (called ) in ; it is also referred to as   or  when used as a robe (called ). The  is a formal attire usually worn by men, though it was also fashionable for women to wear it in some dynasties, such as in the Tang dynasty.

Terminology 

The term  is generic term which refers to clothing decorated with a rank badge called , which is typically a mandarin square or roundels, to indicate its wearer's rank. They were typically worn by government officials.

History

Han dynasty 
The collar of the Han dynasty  were not turned on both sides and the shape of its edges were similar to the styles worn in the Sui and Tang dynasties. It was also during the early years of the Han dynasty that the shape of the  worn in the later dynasties, such as in the Ming dynasties, started to develop.

Wei, Jin, Northern, and Southern dynasties / Six dynasties 

It was only in the era of the Six dynasties that the  began to be worn as an outer garment under the influence of the culture of ethnic minorities which founded the minority nationalities regime in the Wei and Jin dynasties period. It is also during the Six dynasties period that the  started to be worn as a form of formal clothing. Thus, these ethnic minorities also played a significant role in laying the foundation for the popularity of the  used in the subsequent dynasties.

Influence of the Xianbei 
When the  entered the Central plains, their dressing culture influenced the clothing culture of the Han people in the Central plains.
The Northern Wei period was marked by the cultural integration between the Xianbei and the Han Chinese. In the Northern Wei, however, the  worn by unearthed terracotta warriors were closed in the -style instead of -style, which reflects its  characteristics. Since the Northern Wei dynasty, the shapes of the Han Chinese's  also started to be influenced by the -style robe which originated in Western Asia and were then spread to the East through the Sogdians of Central Asia. 

Influence of the Sogdians 

The Sogdians and their descendants (mostly from the merchant class) who lived in China during this period also wore a form of knee-length, -style kaftan that retained their own ethnic characteristics but also showed some influences from East Asia (i.e., Chinese and early Turks). Under the influence and the demands of the Chinese population, most Sogdian attire in China had to be closed to the right in the -style.

Sui and Tang dynasties, Five dynasties and Ten Kingdoms period 
In the Tang dynasty, the descendants of the Xianbei and the other non-Chinese people who ruled northern China from 304 – 581 AD lost their ethnic identity and became Chinese; the term Han was used to refer to all people of the Tang dynasty instead of describing the population ruled by the Xianbei elites during the Northern dynasties. 

Some women also wore  under their .  

In the Tang dynasty, a long, red  with long sleeves was worn by the scholars and government officials; it was worn together with a headwear called .

Foreign influences 

Influenced by foreign cultures, some  could have a band of fabric decorated with Central Asian roundels which would run down at the centre of the robe as a form of partial decoration.

It was also popular to wear . Almost all figurines and mural paintings depicting female court attendants dressed in men's clothing are wearing . The  which was popular in this period was the clothing worn by the Tartars and the people who lived in the Western regions, which was brought from the Silk Road. In some unearthed pottery figures wearing  dating from the Tang dynasty, it was found that the  had three buttons on the collar. After the High Tang dynasty period, the influences of  progressively started to fade and the clothing started to become more and more loose.

Song dynasty 
The  had a large overlapping region being held down by a broad strip of fabric; it also had a long line which divided the front part of the gown.

Liao, Jin and Western Xia dynasties

Liao dynasty 

Khitan men wore the Khitan-style  with a belt at their waist and trousers tucked into felt boots. The Khitan-style  differed from those worn by the Han Chinese. The back slits facilitated horse-riding and protected their legs from the cold. Some of them had no slits. Their  had narrow sleeves,  closed on the left side, was unadorned.

Jin dynasty

Western Xia

Yuan dynasty

Ming dynasty 
Following the founding of the Ming dynasty, the emperor restored the old system of the Tang and Song dynasties.

The clothing of the Ming dynasty were predominantly red in colour.

It has a round collar without a high-standing collar which is secured with button; it overlaps on the front side and closes at the right side in the -style, which follows the traditional  system. It also have side slits on the right and left side. Men's  and  also have side panels called  at the side slits to conceal the undergarments. These side panels are also referred as 'side ears' which are unique structures in the Ming dynasty's ; this specific structure reflect the combination  and ethnic minority costumes (i.e. the Mongols). The 'side ear' also allows for greater ease of movement and can increase the looseness of robe.

Qing dynasty 

During the Qing dynasty, the Manchu rulers enforced the  policy along with the 10 exemptions; among the exempted people were the Han Chinese women who were allowed to continue wearing the Ming-style  and the theatre performers on-stage. While  was used in dominant sphere of society (ritual and official locations),  continued to be used in the subordinate societal sphere, such as in women's quarters and theatres.

Wedding garment

Officials' and/or the nobles'  were also a form of wedding attire for commoners.

Influence and derivatives

Korea

Dallyeong 

During the rule of Queen Jindeok of Silla, Kim Chunchu personally travelled to the Tang dynasty to request for clothing and belts and voluntarily accepted the official uniform system of the Tang dynasty; this included the  among many other clothing items. Since then, the  continued to be worn until the end of Joseon.

Wonsam 

Japan 
In Japan, the formal court attire for men and women was established by the start of the 8th century and was based on the court attire of the Tang dynasty.

According to the Ming dynasty's Government letter against Toyotomi Hideyoshi, the Ming Government bestowed on him a set of  containing a red  with  mandarin square, a dark blue , and a green .

Vietnam

Áo viên lĩnh 
However, this fashion gradually faded away from their daily lives due to the clothing reforms decreed by the Nguyen lords.

See also 

List of

Notes

References

External links 

 Yuanlingpao decorated Central Asian roundels as partial decorations
 Weaving a realm

Chinese traditional clothing